Indoor Living is the sixth studio album by American indie rock band Superchunk, released by Merge Records in 1997. It was recorded at Echo Park Studios in Bloomington, Indiana, and mixed at Overdub Lane, Durham, North Carolina. It was engineered by John Plymale and produced by Plymale and Superchunk.

A video was released for "Watery Hands" featuring comedians David Cross and Janeane Garofalo.

Track listing
"Unbelievable Things" – 5:21
"Burn Last Sunday" – 4:52
"Marquee" – 4:01
"Watery Hands" – 4:31
"Nu Bruises" – 2:41
"Every Single Instinct" – 4:07
"Song for Marion Brown" – 4:10
"The Popular Music" – 4:04
"Under Our Feet" – 3:37
"European Medicine" – 5:11
"Martinis on the Roof" – 5:57

References

1997 albums
Superchunk albums
Merge Records albums